Tuting is a town and headquarters of an eponymous circle in the Upper Siang district in Arunachal Pradesh, India. Tuting is the center of an assembly constituency, and also home to an Indian Military headquarters. The border area reports frequent incursion attempts by the Chinese People's Liberation Army, including an attempt to construct a road in Indian territory.

Location 

It is located on the  proposed Mago-Thingbu to Vijaynagar Arunachal Pradesh Frontier Highway along the McMahon Line,  alignment map of which can be seen here and here. Tsangpo river (Brahmaputra) enters here from Tibet and natives know it as the Tsang Chu, downstream of here it is called the Siang river and Bramhaputra in Assam.

Administration

Tuting-Yingkiong is one of the Arunachal Pradesh Legislative Assembly. Tuting town is under the administration of an (ADC) Additional Deputy Commissioner. Tuting town is the head office of the ADC.

Culture
Tuting is populated by Adi tribe who are the indigenous inhabitants but small population of other neighbouring tribes like Memba and Khamba are also settled in this town nowadays.

In Gelling circle in northern reaches of Tuting, Memba people are indigenous tribe who follow Nyingma Mahayana Buddhism whose key festivals of Losar, Torgya, Dhruba and Tsobum are celebrated by performing Bardo Chham animal-mask folk dance at gonpas.

Tourism
Trekking and scenery.

Transport

Highway 
Tuting is connected to Yingkiong and Pasighat in the south and until ITBF office at Gelling in the north on the LAC via the Pasighat-Aalo-Tuting-Gelling strategic India-China Border Roads.

Tuting Airport
Tuting AGL is an Advanced Landing Ground airstrip of Indian Airforce.

Map

See also

 North-East Frontier Agency
 List of people from Arunachal Pradesh
 Religion in Arunachal Pradesh
 Cuisine of Arunachal Pradesh
 List of institutions of higher education in Arunachal Pradesh
 Yingkiong

References 

Cities and towns in Upper Siang district